Ipuseng Ditshetelo is a member of the National Assembly of South Africa. She is a member of the United Christian Democratic Party.

References

Year of birth missing (living people)
Living people
Members of the National Assembly of South Africa
United Christian Democratic Party politicians
Women members of the National Assembly of South Africa
Place of birth missing (living people)